The 1988 English Professional Championship was a professional non-ranking snooker tournament, which took place between 4 and 10 February 1988 at the Corn Exchange in Ipswich, England.

Dean Reynolds won the title by defeating Neal Foulds 9–5 in the final.

Main draw

References

English Professional Championship
English Professional Championship
English Professional Championship
English Professional Championship